Saint Anne's Church is a 20th-century Catholic church in Ardclough, Ireland.

Location

History

A Catholic chapel was built in 1810 by Valentine Lawless, 2nd Baron Cloncurry, on a site donated by him.

The current church was built in 1985 on land donated by Michael and Máire Costello. It was dedicated in 1985 by Patrick Lennon, Catholic Bishop of Kildare and Leighlin.

Building

St. Anne's Church is a square modern church.

References

Religion in County Kildare
Roman Catholic churches in County Kildare
1985 establishments in Ireland